Sergio Alejandro Dipp Walthe (born July 23, 1988) is a Mexican sportscaster for ESPN Deportes and ESPN International. He co-hosts a Latin American edition of SportsCenter and NFL Live. He also covers the Mexico national football team for ESPN Deportes.

Dipp has covered a variety of major sporting events. He served as a sideline reporter on ESPN for Monday Night Football in 2017, covered four Super Bowls (XLVIII, XLIX, 50, LI) and was a commentator for the 2012 Summer Olympics.

Early life
Dipp was born as Sergio Alejandro Dipp Walthe, in Mexicali, Mexico. Later, Dipp moved to Monterrey, Nuevo León. Dipp attended college in Monterrey, Mexico where he studied communications. While in Mexico, he played American Football and was listed as a defensive-lineman.

Career

Early career
Dipp started his professional career in the sports section of "La Afición" in Milenio Television. Later for, Multimedios Deportes, he covered the Super Bowl, NBA All-Star Game, matches of the Mexico national football team and the 2012 Summer Olympics.

ESPN
Dipp was hired by ESPN in 2013, mainly to work for their Spanish counterpart, ESPN Deportes. In Week 11 of the NFL Season, Dipp covered the Raiders vs. Patriots game in Mexico City for NFL Live and ESPN Sunday Countdown.

Monday Night Football
In 2017, ESPN opened Monday Night Football with special back-to-back games. The regular broadcast team led by Sean McDonough, Jon Gruden and Lisa Salters covered the first game. However, Beth Mowins, Rex Ryan and Dipp called the second game. When reporting from the sideline in the first quarter, Dipp stumbled over his words while giving an update on Broncos' coach Vance Joseph. Dipp then said the line "And here he is; having the time of his life!" After the incident, Dipp trended on social media sites such as Twitter and did not appear on air again during the game, but gave off-air reports on injuries and updates from the sidelines, and held a post-game interview with Broncos quarterback Trevor Siemian. After the game, his producer Tim Corrigan said Dipp handled the situation with "class" and said Dipp has a "bright future."

Television

Programs

References

1988 births
Living people
Sports commentators
Mexican television personalities
Sportspeople from Mexicali
National Football League announcers